Alex Bisiak (5 August 1919 – 2009) was a Peruvian weightlifter. He competed in the men's light-heavyweight event at the 1948 Summer Olympics.

References

External links
 

1919 births
2009 deaths
Peruvian male weightlifters
Olympic weightlifters of Peru
Weightlifters at the 1948 Summer Olympics
Place of birth missing
20th-century Peruvian people
21st-century Peruvian people